Designed by America's famous architect Frank Lloyd Wright, the Schaberg House was commissioned in 1950 by Donald and Mary Lou Schaberg.  The house is an example of Wright's now-famous Usonian style. The house is located in Okemos, Ingham County, central-southern Michigan.

History

According to Thomas Heinz in his book "The Vision of Frank Lloyd Wright", Donald Schaberg worked in the lumber industry in Lansing, Michigan.  The Schabergs had been friends with the Edwards family before, and when the Edwards commissioned Wright to design them a house (James Edwards House), and the Schabergs liked what they saw, the Schabergs commissioned Wright to design a home for themselves. 

Don and Mary Lou Schaberg visited Wright at his home, Taliesin, so that the architect could understand the needs of the young couple better. It took many months and many reminder notes before Wright would send the plans for their new home. But when they came it was worth the wait. As Wright wrote, "your patience will be rewarded this side of heaven".

Wright designed the house in 1950, and the Schabergs built the house in 1957. It was completed in 1958. 

The Schabergs commissioned John H. "Jack" Howe, Wright's right-hand man, to design an addition to the house that was finished in 1964. In 1968, Schaberg designed and had built a 40-foot tower adjoining the home. An inground swimming pool (pictured) was built in 1973.

Wright's other area work
 Erling P. Brauner House
 Goetsch–Winckler House
 James Edwards House

References

 Storrer, William Allin. The Frank Lloyd Wright Companion. University Of Chicago Press, 2006,  (S.328)
 Heinz, Thomas A. The Vision of Frank Lloyd Wright: A complete guide to the designs of an architectural genius. Chartwell Books, Inc., 2003

External links
peterbeers.net: Schaberg House
Frank Lloyd Wright Foundation
Frank Lloyd Wright Preservation Trust
Exterior photographs taken of the site

Frank Lloyd Wright buildings
Houses in Ingham County, Michigan
Houses completed in 1958